These are the official results of the Men's triple jump event at the 2003 World Championships in Paris, France. There were a total number of 24 participating athletes, with the final held on Monday 25 August 2003.

Medalists

Schedule
All times are Central European Time (UTC+1)

Abbreviations
All results shown are in metres

Qualification

Final

See also
Athletics at the 2003 Pan American Games - Men's triple jump

References
 Results(  2009-05-14)
 todor66

J
Triple jump at the World Athletics Championships